Cognetics may refer to:

 Cognetics, the concept introduced by Jef Raskin
 Cognetics Corporation